Bhiradi  is a village in the southern state of Karnataka, India. It is located in the Raybag taluk of Belgaum district in Karnataka.

Murshiddeswar Temple Bhiradi

Mahadev Temple

Margadevi Temple Bhiradi

Demographics
 India census, Bhiradi had a population of 7743 with 4029 males and 3714 females.

MARGADEVI TEMPLE
NEAR AMBEDKAR NAGAR BHIRADI

References

ಮುರಸ್ದಿದ್ದೇಶ್ವರ

ಮುರಸ್ದಿದ್ದೇಶ್ವರ ದೇವಸ್ಥಾನ

   ೮೦೦ ವರ್ಷದ ಇತಿಹಾಸ ವುಳ್ಳ ಪ್ರಸಿದ್ಧ ದೇವಸ್ಥಾನ ಇದು. 
ಪ್ರತಿ ವರ್ಷ ದೀಪಾವಳಿ ಹಬ್ಬದ ಸಂದರ್ಭದಲ್ಲಿ ಜಾತ್ರೆ ನಡೆಯುತ್ತದೆ. 
ಯಾವುದೆ ಭೇದ ಭಾವ ವಿಲ್ಲದೆ ಈ ಜಾತ್ರೆಯಲ್ಲಿ ಊರಿನ ಜನರು ಪಾಲ್ಗೊಳ್ಳುವರು. 

Villages in Belagavi district